John W. Renshaw (28 December 1877 – 12 October 1955) was a unionist politician in Northern Ireland.

Born in Newry, Renshaw studied at the Newry Intermediate School, Queen's College, Galway and Queen's College, Belfast, before becoming a teacher at the Croydon High School.  In 1911, he moved to become Principal of the Shaftesbury House Tutorial College.

In 1943, Renshaw was elected to the Northern Ireland House of Commons to represent the Queen's University of Belfast for the Ulster Unionist Party, although he did not stand at the 1945 Northern Ireland general election.  He was a member of the Senate of Queen's University Belfast from 1938 until his death.

In his spare time, Renshaw was a member of the Freemasons.

References

1877 births
1955 deaths
Alumni of Queen's University Belfast
Members of the House of Commons of Northern Ireland 1938–1945
Ulster Unionist Party members of the House of Commons of Northern Ireland
Members of the House of Commons of Northern Ireland for Queen's University of Belfast